The Ugaritic pantheon included deities of local origin, many of whom are also known from Eblaite sources from the third millennium BCE or Amorite ones from the early second millennium BCE, as well as Hurrian and Mesopotamian ones. The Ugaritic pantheon is considered better documented than other aspects of Ugaritic religion, such as the life of the clergy or the social context of various offerings. Over two hundred names of deities are known from Ugaritic texts, though it has been argued the number of these who were an object of active worship was lower. Many of the names are binomial, and as such may refer either to a single deity and their epithet, to two deities syncretized into one, or to a closely associated pair.

The presence of Hurrian deities in the pantheon is considered one of the main differences between the religion of the inhabitants of Ugarit and those known from other areas inhabited by speakers of Northwest Semitic languages, for example Canaan, understood by researchers of Ancient Near Eastern religions as the area between Byblos and Gaza. It has been suggested that it is not possible to divide the gods worshiped into this city into separate Ugaritic and Hurrian pantheons.

The iconography of most Ugaritic deities is presently unknown due to lack of inscriptions identifying their depictions.

Major deities

Minor deities

Hurrian deities

Demons

References

Bibliography

 

Ugaritic
Mythology-related lists